ZNBB-FM is a religious radio station in Nassau, Bahamas.

External links 
 

Radio stations in the Bahamas
Christian radio stations in North America
Radio stations established in 2010
2010 establishments in the Bahamas
Radio 74 Internationale radio stations